EOS-04 or Earth Observation Satellite - 04 (formerly known as RISAT-1A) is an Indian Space Research Organisation Radar Imaging Satellite designed to provide high quality images under all weather conditions for applications such as Agriculture, Forestry & Plantations, Soil Moisture & Hydrology and Flood mapping. It is a follow on to RISAT-1 satellite with similar configuration. The satellite is developed by the ISRO and it is sixth in series of RISAT satellites.

Satellite description 
Synthetic aperture radar can be used for Earth observation irrespective of the light and weather conditions of the area being imaged. It complements/supplements data from Resourcesat, Cartosat and RISAT-2B Series. The EOS-04 orbit is polar and sun-synchronous at 06:00 AM LTDN, at approximate altitude of 529 km.

Launch 
EOS-04 was launched on the Polar Satellite Launch Vehicle (PSLV-C52) from First Launch Pad(FLP), SDSC, SHAR, Sriharikota at 05:59 hrs IST (00:29 hrs UTC) on 14 February 2022. It was launched along with two ridesharing satellites, INS-2TD a technology demonstrator by ISRO and INSPIREsat-1 a university satellite. 

EOS-04 captured first images on 25 February 2022 after launch.

See also 

 RISAT
 PSLV

References 

Earth observation satellites of India
Space synthetic aperture radar
Spacecraft launched by India in 2022